Dai Houliang (born 20 August 1963) is a Chinese chemical engineer and business executive currently serving as chairman of China National Petroleum Corporation. He is an alternate member of the 19th CPC Central Committee.

Biography
Dai was born in Jiangdu County, Jiangsu, on 20 August 1963. He secondary studied at Dinggou High School. In July 1981, he was accepted to Changzhou University, where he majored in organic chemical industry. Beginning in 1985, he served in several posts in Yangzi Petrochemical, including deputy general manager, general manager, and chairman. He was appointed deputy financial director of Sinopec, one of the three largest state-owned oil companies in China, in September 2005, becoming vice president in November 2005 and senior vice president and financial director in May 2006. In June 2008, he joined the China Petrochemical Corporation, where he was promoted to general manager in May 2016 and to chairman in May 2018. On 17 January 2020, he was appointed chairman of China National Petroleum Corporation, replacing Wang Yilin.

Honours and awards
 2016 State Science and Technology Progress Award (Special Prize) for the development and application of high efficiency and environmental protection aromatics complete set technology
 November 2017 Member of the Chinese Academy of Engineering (CAE)

References

External links
 Dai Houliang on petrochina.com.cn

1963 births
Living people
People from Yangzhou
Changzhou University alumni
People's Republic of China politicians from Jiangsu
Chinese Communist Party politicians from Jiangsu
Members of the Chinese Academy of Engineering
Alternate members of the 19th Central Committee of the Chinese Communist Party